Ernest Cherrington (1877–1950) was a leading temperance journalist (see temperance movement). He became active in the Anti-Saloon League and was appointed editor of the organization's publishing house, the American Issue Publishing Company. He edited and contributed to the writing of The Standard Encyclopedia of the Alcohol Problem, a comprehensive six-volume work. In addition, he was active in establishing the World League Against Alcoholism.

Cherrington favored education over the coersive use of force to bring about Prohibition and sobriety, a position in direct opposition to that of Anti-Saloon leader Wayne Wheeler. Following a number of name changes, the league is now the American Council on Alcohol Problems.

Cherrington remained active in temperance activities until shortly before his death in 1950.

Early life 
Cherrington was born on November 24, 1877 in Hamden, Ohio. He went to college at Ohio Wesleyan University and then became a teacher. Cherrington was against the consumption of alcohol and the effects it had on the declining mortality of his fellow Americans. He then decided to leave teaching to become newspaper reporter and critic of alcohol consumption.

Ohio Anti-Saloon League 
In 1901, Cherrington joined the Ohio Anti-Saloon League, who was the leading organization lobbying the prohibition in the United States in the early 20th century. Cherrington would then climb the ladders within the organization and find himself becoming the assistant superintendent of the Ohio Anti-Saloon League, and then finally being promoted to the superintendent of the Washington Anti-Saloon League.

References

 Aaron, Paul, and Musto, David. Temperance and Prohibition in America: An Historical Overview. In: Moore, Mark H., and Gerstein, Dean R. (eds.) Alcohol and Public Policy: Beyond the Shadow of Prohibition.. Washington, DC: National Academy Press, 1981. pp. 127–180.
 Blocker, Jack S. American Temperance Movements: Cycles of Reform. Boston: Twayne, 1989.
 Cherrington, Ernest. America and the World Liquor Problem. Westerville, OH: American Issue Publishing Co., 1922.
 Odegard, Peter H. Pressure Politics: The Story of the Anti-Saloon League. NY: Columbia University Press, 1928.
 Westerville (Ohio) Public Library. Leaders: Ernest Cherrington. Westerville Public Library website.

External links 
 Ernest Cherrington  (Westerville Public Library)

Chrerrington
1877 births
1950 deaths